Three ships of the Royal Navy were named Brune, two of them were vessels captured from the French.

 , a Blonde-class frigate
 , a Nymphe-class frigate
 , a Bann-class gunboat

Royal Navy ship names